Smithsonian Affiliations is a division of the Smithsonian Institution that establishes long-term partnerships with non-Smithsonian museums and educational and cultural organizations in order to share collections, exhibitions and educational strategies and conduct joint research.

Partner organizations are known as "Smithsonian Affiliates" and are allowed to use the tag line "In Association with the Smithsonian Institution" and the approved Smithsonian Affiliations logo on their website, programming, and marketing material. Any 501(c)(3) nonprofit or publicly operated educational entity can apply to become a Smithsonian Affiliate.

History
The Smithsonian Affiliations program was established in 1996 by Smithsonian Secretary I. Michael Heyman with the approval of the Smithsonian Board of Regents, in response to several challenges the Institution faced at the time: a decrease in federal funding, limited storage space for expanding collections, and the need to make the Institution more reflective of the nation without operating additional museums outside of Washington, D.C.

Commission on the Future of the Smithsonian Institution
In 1993, the Commission on the Future of the Smithsonian Institution introduced the first proposal for initiatives promoting strategic, collections-based partnerships at the Institution.  The Commission, composed of 22 members appointed by the Smithsonian Board of Regents, was charged with examining the Institution's ability to uphold James Smithson's vision of an organization dedicated to "the increase and diffusion of knowledge" despite a changing society and increasing financial hardships. Of the four initiatives proposed by the Commission: Educate More of the Nation's People; Collections, Research and Exhibitions; Governance; and Assure the Future, two directly called for the creation of strategic partnerships and making artifacts in the collections accessible to other museums.

To Educate More of the Nation's People: "Build collaborative partnerships with other museums, research centers, and educational institutions throughout the nation."

Collections, Research and Exhibitions:  "Shape a master plan for maintenance of the priceless collections, including the sharing of collections through long-term or permanent loans to partner institutions."

Significant emphasis was placed on the benefits that partnerships with outside museums would create for the Institution.  By dispersing artifacts to museums in a responsible way, the Commission believed it, "could make the Institution more reflective of our nation… [as well as] address the problem of storing, curating, studying, and exhibiting the constantly growing collections."

Creating Smithsonian Affiliations
In 1996, during his second year as Secretary, Heyman observed several challenges facing the Institution.  Closely aligned with the announcements presented by the "Commission on the Future of the Smithsonian Institution" in 1993, Heyman was faced with the challenges of dwindling storage for expanding collections, decreasing funds, and the need to reinforce the Smithsonian's identity as the nation's museum.  In addition, the Institution began to see increased interest from outside museums for partnerships and loans of artifacts that extended beyond standing practices.  Although collaborative agreements in the form of traveling exhibitions, joint exhibition sponsorship, and loans had been entered in the past by different Smithsonian museums, no infrastructure existed to provide institution-wide oversight and coordination of such partnerships. Heyman responded to these challenges by creating the Smithsonian Affiliations program to oversee and manage collections-based partnerships with other museums.  As stated by the minutes from the Smithsonian Board of Regents meeting housed in the Smithsonian Institution Archives, the program was formally approved by the Board of Regents on September 15, 1996.

Using the occasion of the Smithsonian Institution's 150th Anniversary, Smithsonian Affiliations was one of several outreach initiatives introduced by Heyman to expand the Institution's reach nationally.
  In addition to the Affiliations program, the Institution became more accessible through its presence on the World Wide Web and through the largest traveling exhibition Smithsonian ever mounted, America's Smithsonian.  Secretary Heyman made formal announcements about the Affiliations program while delivering opening remarks for the Smithsonian's 150th Birthday Party on the Mall and in a number of cities for the opening of America's Smithsonian:

"The Smithsonian of the future must provide access to its collections and its vast resources.  There is no value in being just the largest if we do not share the Smithsonian with as many people as possible.  It means making sure those who cannot travel to Washington can somehow experience and enjoy the Smithsonian." – Secretary I. Michael Heyman

Growth of the program
The program was well-received by museums across the country.  At the end of the 1997 fiscal year, there were already 21 organizations recognized as Affiliates. As of 2017, there are over 200 Affiliates.

Program overview
Smithsonian Affiliations considers membership proposals from organizations that will advance the Smithsonian Institution's mission and strategic plan.  Successful applicants are non-profit or publicly operated organizations whose missions are directed toward advancing research, knowledge, and education in science, history, and the arts.  The guidelines of Smithsonian Affiliations establishes that the Smithsonian Institution maintain appropriate control over all collections loaned and that Affiliates cover all costs associated with borrowing and exhibiting objects.  To qualify as an Affiliate, an organization must prove that it is able to properly care for, protect, and exhibit Smithsonian collections on a long-term basis.  Strong applicants are organizations that are fiscally sound and capable of developing, installing, and evaluating professional exhibitions.

While serving as an Affiliate, organizations are required to grant Smithsonian Institution curators and personnel access to visit borrowed artifacts, provide the Smithsonian with reports and information necessary to monitor the state of the partnership, and uphold the integrity of the Board of Regents.

Becoming an Affiliate
To become an Affiliate, organizations must submit an application package to Smithsonian Affiliations.  Applicants are required to provide documentation that confirms IRS status as a 501(c)3 entity and a narrative detailing how the agreement will be mutually beneficial.  Applications must also include a copy of the institution's mission statement, an organizational chart, an annual report, and a facilities report that follows the American Alliance of Museums format.  Once approved, Affiliates are required to sign a Smithsonian Affiliations Agreement form and are assigned a National Outreach Manager to oversee loans and projects.  All loan agreements are set for defined period of time.

Programs and professional development
Affiliate organizations participate in a number of professional training, outreach, and programming initiatives coordinated by the Smithsonian Affiliations office.
 Smithsonian Affiliations National Conference: At the annual conference, professionals of Affiliate organizations participate in a number of workshops, lectures, and training sessions led by Smithsonian, Affiliate, and museum industry experts.
 Smithsonian Affiliations Visiting Professional Program: Professionals of Affiliate organizations receive training from Smithsonian officials while visiting and working in Washington, D.C.

Educational collaborations
The Smithsonian Affiliations program supports, develops, and organizes a number of collaborative programs to promote education in science, art, history, and culture.
 National Youth Summit: The 50th Anniversary of the Freedom Rides:  This NEH-funded program featured a distinguished panel of Freedom Riders at the National Museum of American History.  The event was broadcast live to five Affiliate sites.  Students across the country were able to engage panelists in dialogue about their experience as civil rights activists.
 Places of Invention:  The Places of Invention project is a collaboration between the Lemelson Center for the Study of Invention and Innovation (National Museum of American History) and Smithsonian Affiliations, supported by a grant from the National Science Foundation.  The program asks six Affiliate organizations to conduct community research for the purpose of documenting their community as a "place of invention".  The results of this research will be included in the Lemelson Center's exhibition of the same name scheduled to open in 2015.
 Youth Capture the Colorful Cosmos:  This program is a collaboration between Smithsonian Affiliations and the Harvard-Smithsonian Astrophysical Observatory.  This program offers students the opportunity to research the composition of the universe and convert telescopic images into art projects.  Thirteen Affiliate organizations participate in this collaboration, which teaches participants how to control MicroObservatory robotic telescopes over the internet and take astronomy images of the universe.  Participant-generated images will be used in astrophotography exhibitions featuring the students' work.
 Smithsonian Immigration/Migration Initiative:  This large-scale initiative centered in the National Museum of American History and the Center for Folklife and Cultural Heritage recruited eight Affiliate partners to serve in its advisory group.  This collaboration works to examine the ways young members of immigrant communities in the United States can tell their own story.   The advisory group invites representatives to Washington, D.C. to discuss programs and collections that focus on immigration and migration in cities across the United States.
 Spark!Lab Outreach Kit:  The Lemelson Center for the Study of Invention and Innovation created traveling kits featuring its most popular and effective hands-on invention activities from the Spark!Lab.  These kits were sent to five Affiliate museums.  Between April 2011 and January 2012, more than 20,000 visitors used the Spark!Lab kits at Affiliate sites.
 Let's Do History Tour:  Educators from the National Museum of American History toured several cities for the purpose of influencing the way American history is taught by K-12 teachers.  Smithsonian professionals introduced participants to teaching techniques, online tools, and educational content for use in classrooms.  Affiliate organizations in the selected cities presented information on resources, in their collections and locally, that can be used when teaching American history.
 Universal Design Webinar:  This webinar was a collaboration between Smithsonian Affiliations, the American Alliance of Museums, and the Smithsonian Accessibility Program.  It was developed to promote dialogue on universal design issues in museums.  Twenty-four Affiliate organizations served as host sites.  The program was transcribed into an article in Museum magazine.

List of Affiliates by state/country

Alabama 

 Anniston Museum of Natural History (Anniston)
 Birmingham Civil Rights Institute (Birmingham)
 U.S. Space and Rocket Center (Huntsville)

Alaska 
 Anchorage Museum (Anchorage)

Arizona 
Bisbee Mining and Historical Museum (Bisbee)
 Heard Museum (Phoenix)
 Musical Instrument Museum (Phoenix)
 Western Spirit: Scottsdale's Museum of the West (Scottsdale)
 Arizona Historical Society (Tucson)
 Arizona State Museum (Tucson)
 Desert Caballeros Western Museum (Wickenburg)

Arkansas 
Mid-America Science Museum (Hot Springs)
 Historic Arkansas Museum (Little Rock)

California 

 USS Hornet Sea, Air & Space Museum (Alameda)
 Sam and Alfreda Maloof Foundation for Arts and Crafts (Alta Loma)
 Cerritos Library (Cerritos)
 Columbia Memorial Space Center (Downey)
 Western Science Center (Hemet)
 Museum of Latin American Art (Long Beach)
 California African American Museum (Los Angeles)
 California Science Center (Los Angeles)
 Japanese American National Museum (Los Angeles)
 LA Plaza de Cultura y Artes (Los Angeles)
 Aerospace Museum of California (McClellan Park)
 Agua Caliente Cultural Museum (Palm Springs)
 California State Railroad Museum (Sacramento)
 Hiller Aviation Museum (San Carlos)
 Maritime Museum of San Diego (San Diego)
 Museum of Us (San Diego)
 San Diego Air and Space Museum (San Diego)
 San Diego History Center (San Diego)
 Aquarium of the Bay (San Francisco)
 Museum of the African Diaspora (San Francisco)
 The Mexican Museum (San Francisco)
 Museum of Sonoma County (Santa Rosa)

Colorado 
University Corporation for Atmospheric Research (Boulder)
 Denver Museum of Nature and Science (Denver)
 History Colorado (Denver)
 Littleton Museum (Littleton)
 Pinhead Institute (Telluride)
 Telluride Historical Museum (Telluride)

Connecticut 
Connecticut Historical Society (Hartford)
 Mashantucket Pequot Museum and Research Center (Mashantucket)
 Mystic Seaport Museum (Mystic)

Delaware 

 Hagley Museum and Library (Wilmington, Delaware)

Florida 

 Bishop Museum of Science and Nature (Bradenton)
 The Museum of Arts and Sciences (Daytona Beach)
 Kennedy Space Center Visitor Complex (Merritt Island)
 Polk Museum of Art at Florida Southern College (Lakeland)
 Florida International University (Miami)
 History Miami Museum (Miami)
 Phillip and Patricia Frost Museum of Science (Miami)
 The Baker Museum / Artis—Naples (Naples)
 Orange County Regional History Center (Orlando)
 The Mennello Museum of American Art (Orlando)
 Marie Selby Botanical Gardens (Sarasota)
 St. Augustine Lighthouse & Maritime Museum (St. Augustine)
 Tampa Bay History Center (Tampa)

Georgia 

 David J. Sencer CDC Museum (Atlanta)
 Georgia Aquarium (Atlanta)
 Morris Museum of Art (Augusta)
 Booth Western Art Museum (Cartersville)
 Tellus Science Museum (Cartersville)
 Southern Museum of Civil War and Locomotive History (Kennesaw)
 Georgia's Old Governor's Mansion (Milledgeville)

Hawaii 

 Lyman Museum and Mission House (Hilo)
 Pearl Harbor Aviation Museum (Honolulu)
 Kona Historical Society (Kealakekua)

Illinois 

 Schingoethe Center of Aurora University (Aurora)
 University of Illinois at Urbana-Champaign (Champaign)
 Adler Planetarium (Chicago)
 DuSable Museum of African American History (Chicago)
 Shedd Aquarium (Chicago)
 Northwest Territory Historic Center (Dixon)
 Lizzadro Museum of Lapidary Art (Oak Brook)
 Peoria Riverfront Museum (Peoria)

Indiana 
 Conner Prairie Interactive History Park (Fishers)
 Indiana Historical Society (Indianapolis)

Iowa 
National Czech & Slovak Museum & Library (Cedar Rapids)
The Putnam Museum & Science Center (Davenport)
Dubuque Museum of Art (Dubuque)
National Mississippi River Museum & Aquarium (Dubuque)
Grinnell College (Grinnell)

Kansas 

 Cosmosphere (Hutchinson)

Kentucky 
 Kentucky Historical Society (Frankfort)
 International Museum of the Horse (Lexington)
 The Frazier History Museum (Louisville)

Louisiana 

 National World War II Museum (New Orleans)
 Louisiana State Exhibit Museum (Shreveport)

Maine 

 Abbe Museum (Bar Harbor)

Maryland 
 Historic Annopolis (Annapolis)
 B&O Railroad Museum (Baltimore)
 Dr. Samuel D. Harris National Museum of Dentistry (Baltimore)
 Reginald F. Lewis Museum of Maryland African American History and Culture (Baltimore)
 College Park Aviation Museum (College Park)
 Annmarie Sculpture Garden and Arts Center (Solomons)

Massachusetts 
 USS Constitution Museum (Boston)
 Framingham State University (Framingham)
 Lowell National Historical Park (Lowell)
 Plimoth Patuxet Museums (Plymouth)
 Springfield Museums (Springfield)

Michigan 
Yankee Air Museum (Belleville)
Arab American National Museum (Dearborn)
Michigan Science Center (Detroit)
Michigan State University Museum (East Lansing)
Air Zoo (Portage)
The Dennos Museum Center (Traverse City)

Minnesota 
 Bell Museum of Natural History - University of Minnesota (Saint Paul)

Mississippi 
 Mississippi Department of Archives and History (Jackson)

Missouri 
 American Jazz Museum (Kansas City)
 Union Station Kansas City, Inc. (Kansas City)
 Saint Louis Science Center (St. Louis)

Montana 
 Museum of the Rockies (Bozeman, Montana)
 Montana Historical Society (Helena, Montana)

Nebraska 

 Strategic Air Command & Aerospace Museum (Ashland)
 University of Nebraska State Museum (Lincoln)
 Durham Museum (Omaha)

Nevada 
 Las Vegas Natural History Museum (Las Vegas)
 National Atomic Testing Museum (Las Vegas)

New Jersey 
Morris Museum (Morristown)

New Mexico 
 New Mexico Museum of Space History (Alamogordo)
 National Museum of Nuclear Science & History (Albuquerque)
 New Mexico Museum of Natural History and Science (Albuquerque)
 City of Las Cruces Museum System (Las Cruces)
 Hubbard Museum of the American West (Ruidoso)

New York 
 Rockwell Museum (Corning)
Flushing Council on Culture and the Arts (New York City)
Center for Jewish History (New York City)
City Lore (New York City)
Museum of American Finance (New York City)
National Jazz Museum in Harlem (New York City)
Snug Harbor Cultural Center and Botanical Garden (New York City)
Long Island Museum (Stony Brook)

North Carolina 
Carolinas Aviation Museum (Charlotte)
Schiele Museum of Natural History (Gastonia)
Greensboro History Museum (Greensboro)
North Carolina Museum of History (Raleigh)
North Carolina Museum of Natural Sciences (Raleigh)
Cape Fear Museum of History and Science (Wilmington)

Ohio 

 Cummings Center for the History of Psychology (Akron)
 Cincinnati Museum Center (Cincinnati)
 National Underground Railroad Freedom Center (Cincinnati)
 Western Reserve Historical Society (Cleveland)
 Ohio History Connection (Columbus)
 The Works: Ohio Center for History, Art and Technology (Newark)
 Springfield Museum of Art (Springfield)

Oklahoma 
 Oklahoma History Center (Oklahoma City)
 Science Museum Oklahoma (Oklahoma City)
 Stafford Air & Space Museum (Eatherford)

Oregon 
 High Desert Museum (Bend)
 Rice Northwest Museum of Rocks and Minerals (Hillsboro)
 Evergreen Aviation & Space Museum (McMinnville)

Panama 

 Biomuseo (Panama City)
 Museo del Canal Interoceánico de Panamá (Panama City)

Pennsylvania 
 Historic Bethlehem Museums & Sites (Bethlehem)
 National Museum of Industrial History (Bethlehem)
 Army Heritage and Education Center (Carlisle)
 Mercer Museum & Fonthill Castle (Doylestown)
 Delaware & Lehigh National Heritage Corridor (Easton)
 The National Civil War Museum (Harrisburg)
 Antique Automobile Club of America Museum (Hershey)
 African American Museum in Philadelphia (Philadelphia)
 National Museum of American Jewish History (Philadelphia)
 Senator John Heinz History Center (Pittsburgh)
 Railroad Museum of Pennsylvania (Strasburg)

Puerto Rico 
 Arecibo Observatory / Angel Ramos Foundation Science and Visitor Center (Arecibo)
 Universidad Ana G. Mendez (Gurabo)
 Museo de Arte de Puerto Rico (San Juan)

Rhode Island 

 International Tennis Hall of Fame (Newport)
 Rhode Island Historical Society (Woonsocket)

South Carolina 

 South Carolina State Museum (Columbia)
 The Children's Museum of the Upstate (Greenville)
 Upcountry History Museum - Furman University (Greenville)
 Coastal Discovery Museum (Hilton Head Island)
 York County Culture and Heritage Museums (Rock Hill)

South Dakota 
 South Dakota State Historical Society (Pierre)
 National Music Museum (Vermillion)

Tennessee 

 Museum Center at 5ive Points (Cleveland)
 Museum of Appalachia (Clinton)
 International Storytelling Center (Jonesborough)
 McClung Museum of Natural History and Culture (Knoxville)
 Memphis Rock 'N' Soul Museum (Memphis)
 National Civil Rights Museum (Memphis)
 American Museum of Science and Energy (Oak Ridge)

Texas 
 City of Austin Parks and Recreation Department (Austin)
 Frontiers of Flight Museum (Dallas)
 Perot Museum of Nature and Science (Dallas)
 Fort Worth Museum of Science and History (Fort Worth)
 National Museum of the Pacific War (Fredericksburg)
 Space Center Houston (Houston)

 The Health Museum (Houston)

 Irving Arts Center (Irving)
 International Museum of Art and Science (McAllen)
 Ellen Noël Art Museum (Odessa)

 The Witte Museum (San Antonio)
 UTSA-Institute of Texan Cultures (San Antonio)

Vermont 

 Sullivan Museum and History Center (Northfield, Vermont)

Virginia 
 National Inventors Hall of Fame (Alexandria)
 Birthplace of Country Music Museum (Bristol)
 Virginia Museum of Natural History (Martinsville)
 George Washington's Mount Vernon Estate and Gardens (Mount Vernon)
 Hermitage Museum & Gardens (Norfolk)

Washington 

 Whatcom Museum (Bellingham)
 Burke Museum of Natural History and Culture (Seattle)
 Museum of History and Industry (Seattle)
 The Museum of Flight (Seattle)
 Wing Luke Museum of the Asian Pacific American Experience (Seattle)
 Northwest Museum of Arts and Culture (Spokane)

West Virginia 
 Heritage Farm Museum and Village (Huntington)

Wisconsin 
 Kenosha Public Museum (Kenosha)
 Wisconsin Veterans Museum (Madison)
 Wisconsin Maritime Museum (Manitowoc)

Former Affiliates 

 The Bakken Museum (Minneapolis, Minnesota)

Outreach
Affiliate organizations exchange ideas, professional research, and information about programming and exhibitions through a variety of activities including lecture, traveling exhibitions, workshops and reciprocal membership.

Social media
Affiliate organizations share research, exhibitions, and institutional updates through a variety of social media including the Smithsonian Affiliations website, the Affiliate Blog, the quarterly newsletter The Affiliate, the electronic newsletter E-Affiliate, YouTube, Flickr, Facebook and Twitter.

Loans and exhibitions
The following are representative samples of loans of artifacts, works of art, and scientific specimens loaned by the Smithsonian Institution to Smithsonian Affiliate organizations.

The National Museum of American History loaned the Pioneer (locomotive), a Civil War-era locomotive, to the B&O Railroad Museum in Baltimore, Maryland for the exhibit The War Came by Train.

Thomas Moran's painting The Grand Canyon of the Yellowstone, in the collection of the Smithsonian American Art Museum, was loaned to the Buffalo Bill Historical Center in Cody, Wyoming.  The massive painting was on view from June 1, 2009 through October 31, 2009.

Artifacts from the Bisbee Mineral Collection at the National Museum of Natural History were loaned to the Bisbee Mining and Historical Museum in Bisbee, Arizona for use in the exhibit Digging In: Bisbee's Mineral Heritage.

Over 140 space objects, including the original Apollo 13 command module and the space suit worn by commanding astronaut James Lovell, were loaned to the Kansas Cosmosphere and Space Center in Hutchinson, Kansas.

The Durham Museum in Omaha, Nebraska borrowed 174 artifacts for the exhibit American Originals: Collections from the Smithsonian. Borrowed artifacts included the jacket worn by Bob Keeshan while filming the children's television series, Captain Kangaroo, a three-wheel Westcoaster Mailster used by the United States Postal Service in the 1960s, and two oil on canvass paintings of U.S. Supreme Court Justice Thurgood Marshall and Seneca Chief Red Jacket.

The National Museum of American History loaned Kermit the Frog to the National Mississippi River Museum and Aquarium in Dubuque, Iowa for use in the exhibit Toadally Frogs!

The Annmarie Sculpture Garden in Solomons, Maryland has over 20 sculptures on loan from the Hirshhorn Museum and Sculpture Garden.

The National Museum of Natural History loaned the Smithsonian Community Reef to the Putnam Museum and IMAX Theatre in Davenport, Iowa.  The reef is composed of thousands of crocheted natural reef forms and was a highlight of the Sant Ocean Hall exhibit at the National Museum of Natural History .

"The Peoria Falcon," a sheet of copper stylized in the form of a falcon, was loaned to the Lakeview Museum of Arts and Sciences (now Peoria Riverfront Museum) in Peoria, Illinois by the National Museum of Natural History.  The artifact was created during the Mississippian Period and excavated near Peoria, Illinois in the late 1850s.

The National Postal Museum loaned the Railway Post Office to the North Carolina Transportation Museum in Spencer, North Carolina.

The National Museum of Natural History loaned an 18-karat gold Monopoly set covered with precious gemstones to the Museum of American Finance in New York, New York. The board game was designed by artist Sidney Mobell.

The National Museum of Natural History loaned the skeleton of the racehorse, "Lexington," to the International Museum of the Horse in Lexington, Kentucky

The top hat worn by president Abraham Lincoln on the night of his assassination was loaned to the Blackhawk Museum in Danville, California by the National Museum of American History.

The exhibit, Smithsonian Expeditions: Exploring Latin American and the Caribbean at the Miami Museum of Science, borrowed several artifacts from the National Museum of Natural History including painted gourds and a 5-foot-tall monolith from the Nicaraguan island of Momotombito.

The Historic Arkansas Museum borrowed over 40 artifacts from the National Museum of the American Indian for the exhibit We Walk in Two Worlds: The Caddo, Osage and Quapaw in Arkansas.

The Smithsonian American Art Museum loaned three José Campeche paintings to the Museo de Arte de Puerto Rico in San Juan, Puerto Rico.

The Senator John Heinz History Center in Pittsburgh, Pennsylvania has on loan from the National Museum of American History a Bantam Jeep and a piece of the original Star Spangled Banner Flag.

Yokohama prints from the Freer Gallery of Art and the Arthur M. Sackler Gallery were loaned to the Japanese American National Museum in Los Angeles, California for the exhibit Japan After Perry: Views of Yokohama and Meiji Japan.

The National Postal Museum loaned stamp designs and drawings created by president Franklin D. Roosevelt to the Blackhawk Museum in Danville, California.

References

Affiliations